Two ships of the Royal Navy have borne the name HMS Blossom:

 was an 18-gun sloop launched in 1806. She was converted to a survey ship in 1825, was hulked as a lazarette in 1833 and broken up in 1848.
 was a  wooden screw gunboat, originally to have been named HMS Careful, but renamed in 1855 prior to her launch on 21 April 1856. She was broken up in 1864.
HMS Blossom was a screw tank vessel assigned to Gibraltar as a service vessel in May 1902.

References

Royal Navy ship names